WVOO-LP (107.1 FM) was a radio station broadcasting a religious format. Licensed to Columbia, Tennessee, United States, the station was owned by Lighthouse Baptist Church. Its license expired August 1, 2020.

References

VOO-LP
Columbia, Tennessee
Radio stations established in 2005
2005 establishments in Tennessee
Defunct radio stations in the United States
Radio stations disestablished in 2020
2020 disestablishments in Tennessee
VOO-LP
Defunct religious radio stations in the United States